Federico Girotti Bonazza (born 2 June 1999) is an Argentine professional footballer who plays as a forward for Talleres de Córdoba.

Career
Girotti joined the youth system of River Plate in 2010, signing from Escuela Daniel Messina. His first involvement with the club's first-team came during 2018–19, with the forward being an unused substitute for a Primera División fixture against Gimnasia y Esgrima on 2 December 2018. Girotti's professional bow arrived in January 2019 in a 1–3 home loss to Patronato, he was subbed on for the final twenty-six minutes for Lucas Beltrán. He scored his first senior goal in his next league appearance, almost two years later in a Copa de la Liga Profesional win away to Godoy Cruz on 14 November 2020.

On 6 February 2022, Girotti joined Talleres de Córdoba on a deal until the end of 2025.

Career statistics
.

Notes

Honours
River Plate
 Supercopa Argentina: 2019

References

External links

1999 births
Living people
Argentine footballers
People from San Isidro Partido
Argentine people of Italian descent
Sportspeople from Buenos Aires Province
Association football forwards
Argentine Primera División players
Club Atlético River Plate footballers
Talleres de Córdoba footballers